James Michael Ray McAdoo (born January 4, 1993) is an American professional basketball player for the Sun Rockers Shibuya of the B.League in Japan. He played college basketball for the North Carolina Tar Heels, and twice earned second-team all-conference honors in the Atlantic Coast Conference (ACC). He won two NBA championships with the Golden State Warriors. He has also played in various international leagues, including the EuroCup, Turkish Basketball Super League (BSL), and ABA League.

High school career

Born and raised in Norfolk, Virginia, McAdoo attended Norfolk Christian High School. As a junior in 2009–10, he averaged 22.5 points and 9.9 rebounds per game, and as a senior in 2010–11, he averaged 21.6 points and 8.1 rebounds per game. He led Norfolk Christian to consecutive state championships and earned Gatorade Player of the Year honors in Virginia in 2010 and 2011. During his career, he earned USA Today first team and Parade All-American third team honors, as well as earning co-Most Valuable Player honors at both the McDonald's All-America Game (17 points) in Chicago and the Jordan Brand Classic (26 points, 14 rebounds) in Charlotte.

In September 2009, McAdoo committed to the University of North Carolina. After Travis and David Wear transferred from UNC, McAdoo considered graduating a year early so he could join the Tar Heels in 2010, but he ultimately decided to stay at Norfolk Christian through his senior year.

He was rated as the #4 player in the class of 2011 by Scout.com, the #6 player in the ESPNU 100, and the #8 player by Rivals.com.

College career
McAdoo played three seasons at the University of North Carolina, recording career averages of 11.4 points, 5.9 rebounds, 1.0 assists and 1.2 steals in 25.0 minutes over 108 games. As a junior in 2013–14, he earned All-ACC second team honors for the second straight year after averaging 14.2 points, 6.8 rebounds, 1.7 assists and 1.3 steals in 34 games.

On April 3, 2014, he declared for the NBA draft, foregoing his final year of college eligibility.

Professional career

Golden State Warriors (2014–2017)
After going undrafted in the 2014 NBA draft, McAdoo joined the Golden State Warriors for the 2014 NBA Summer League. On September 2, 2014, he signed with the Warriors, but was later waived by the team on October 24. On November 3, 2014, he was acquired by the Santa Cruz Warriors as an affiliate player of Golden State.

On January 19, 2015, McAdoo signed a 10-day contract with the Golden State Warriors. He made his NBA debut later that night as he came off the bench to record 11 points and 5 rebounds in the 122–79 win over the Denver Nuggets. He was not retained by Golden State following the expiration of his contract on January 29, and he returned to Santa Cruz the following day. On February 2, he returned to Golden State, signing a second 10-day contract with the team. Following the expiration of his second 10-day contract, he returned to Santa Cruz where he played two games before being called up again by Golden State on February 19, signing with the team for the rest of the 2014–15 season. He was assigned multiple times to Santa Cruz to finish the season, as he earned NBA D-League All-Rookie first team and All-NBA D-League second team honors. He went on to win a D-League championship with Santa Cruz and an NBA championship with Golden State; he appeared in just over a minute of action for the Warriors during the 2015 NBA Finals against the Cleveland Cavaliers.

McAdoo retained his spot on Golden State's roster for the 2015–16 season, but missed all of January and February because of a sprained toe on his left foot. On March 21, 2016, he made his first career NBA start, recording seven points and six rebounds in 17½ minutes of action in a 109–104 win over the Minnesota Timberwolves. The Warriors returned to the NBA Finals in 2016, where they were defeated in seven games by the Cavaliers.

On July 13, 2016, McAdoo re-signed with the Warriors. The Warriors won 67 games in the 2016–17 season and made their way through to their third straight NBA Finals series. There the Warriors defeated the Cleveland Cavaliers in five games to claim their second championship in three years.

Philadelphia 76ers (2017–2018)
On August 30, 2017, McAdoo signed a two-way contract with the Philadelphia 76ers. Under the terms of the deal, he spent the majority of the 2017–18 season with their NBA G League affiliate, the Delaware 87ers. On January 15, 2018, he was waived by the 76ers.

Agua Caliente Clippers (2018)
On January 25, 2018, McAdoo was reacquired by the Delaware 87ers. The following day, he was traded to the Agua Caliente Clippers in exchange for a 2018 first-round draft pick and the returning player rights to Corey Hawkins.

Auxilium Torino (2018–2019)
On July 15, 2018, McAdoo signed with Italian club Auxilium Torino for 2018–19 LBA season.

Beşiktaş (2019–2020) 
On August 1, 2019, McAdoo signed with Beşiktaş Sompo Japan of the Turkish Basketball Super League (BSL).

Partizan (2020) 
On January 7, 2020, McAdoo signed with KK Partizan of the ABA League.

Sun Rockers Shibuya (2020–present)
On July 2, 2020, McAdoo signed with the Sun Rockers Shibuya of the B.League.

National team career
McAdoo averaged 16.8 points, 8.6 rebounds and 2.0 blocks to help Team USA win the gold medal at the 2009 FIBA Americas Under-16 Championship, played in Argentina. He was subsequently named the 2009 USA Basketball Male Athlete of the Year. In 2010, he won another gold medal after averaging 14.5 points, 7.9 rebounds and 1.9 blocks at the 2010 FIBA Under-17 World Championship, in Germany. He was named to the All-Tournament Team.

Career statistics

NBA

Regular season

|-
| style="text-align:left;background:#afe6ba;"| †
| align="left" | Golden State
| 15 || 0 || 9.1 || .545  || .000 || .560 || 2.5 || .1 || .3 || .6  || 4.1 
|-
| style="text-align:left;"| 
| align="left" | Golden State
| 41 || 1 || 6.4 || .536 || .500 || .531 || 1.4 || .4 || .2 || .2 || 2.9
|-
| style="text-align:left;background:#afe6ba;"| †
| align="left" | Golden State
| 52 || 2 || 8.8 || .530 || .250 || .500 || 1.8 || .3 || .3  || .6  || 2.8
|-
| style="text-align:left;"| 
| align="left" | Philadelphia
| 3 || 0 || 6.0 || .286 || .286 || 1.000 || .7 || .0 || .0  || .3  || 2.7
|- class="sortbottom"
| style="text-align:center;" colspan="2" | Career
| 111 || 3 || 7.9 || .528 || .294 || .534 || 1.7 || .3 || .3 || .4 || 3.0

Playoffs

|-
| style="text-align:left;background:#afe6ba;"| 2015†
| align="left" | Golden State
| 5 || 0 || 2.0 || .667 || .000 || .000 || .8 || .0 || .0 || .2 || .8
|-
| align="left" | 2016
| align="left" | Golden State
| 8 || 0 || 4.8 || .500 || .000 || .250 || 1.0 || .3 || .4 || .3 || .6
|-
| style="text-align:left;background:#afe6ba;"| 2017†
| align="left" | Golden State
| 13 || 0 || 4.3 || .529 || .400 || .667 || 1.0 || .0 || .2 || .2 || 1.8
|- class="sortbottom"
| align="center" colspan=2| Career
| 26 || 0 || 4.0 || .542 || .400 || .500 || 1.0 || .1 || .2 || .2 || 1.3

College

|-
| style="text-align:left;"| 2011–12
| style="text-align:left;"| North Carolina
| 38 || 3 || 15.6 || .434 || .000 || .638 || 3.9 || .3 || .9 || .3 || 6.1
|-
| style="text-align:left;"| 2012–13
| style="text-align:left;"| North Carolina
| 36 || 36 || 30.0 || .445 || .000 || .578 || 7.3 || 1.1 || 1.5 || .4 || 14.4
|-
| style="text-align:left;"| 2013–14
| style="text-align:left;"| North Carolina
| 34 || 34 || 30.1 || .458 || .000 || .537 || 6.8 || 1.7 || 1.3 || .9 || 14.2
|- class="sortbottom"
| style="text-align:center;" colspan="2" | Career
| 108 || 73 || 25.0 || .447 || .000 || .569 || 5.9 || 1.0 || 1.2 || .5 || 11.4

Personal life
McAdoo is an Evangelical Christian. He has spoken about his faith saying, "I just want people to realize I don’t play basketball for myself. No matter what adversities I face, how bad a season goes, or even how good a season goes, at the end of the day I’m playing for a bigger reason, and that’s to glorify my Lord and Savior Jesus Christ."

McAdoo's parents, Ronnie and Janet, both played basketball at Old Dominion in the late 1970s and the early 80s, and went on to play professionally in Europe, while his older sister Kelsey also played basketball at the University of North Carolina at Charlotte.

McAdoo's father is the second cousin of Hall of Fame basketball player Bob McAdoo, who played at North Carolina and in the NBA. McAdoo said he calls Bob "uncle" although he does not know what their exact relationship is, and that "My dad's great-great-great grandfather and [Bob's] great-grandfather are like brothers."

On April 2, 2014, he married Lauren Elizabeth Adkins, a UNC volleyball player.

References

External links

 Draft Express profile
 North Carolina Tar Heels bio
 rivals.com profile
 

1993 births
Living people
21st-century African-American sportspeople
ABA League players
African-American basketball players
Agua Caliente Clippers players
American expatriate basketball people in Italy
American expatriate basketball people in Japan
American expatriate basketball people in Serbia
American expatriate basketball people in Turkey
American men's basketball players
Auxilium Pallacanestro Torino players
Basketball players from Norfolk, Virginia
Beşiktaş men's basketball players
Delaware 87ers players
Golden State Warriors players
Lega Basket Serie A players
KK Partizan players
McDonald's High School All-Americans
North Carolina Tar Heels men's basketball players
Parade High School All-Americans (boys' basketball)
Philadelphia 76ers players
Power forwards (basketball)
Santa Cruz Warriors players
Undrafted National Basketball Association players